Muthu Sangaralingam Sellasamy (13 November 1926 – 1 August 2020) was a Sri Lankan trade unionist, politician and former minister of state.

Early life
Sellasamy was born on 13 November 1926.

Career
Sellasamy was district chairman of the Ceylon Workers' Congress (CWC) before being elected its general-secretary in 1963. He was also president of the Estate Staff Congress, Ceylon Teachers' Congress and Lanka Agriculturists Association.

Sellasamy was the CWC's candidate in Colombo Central at the 1977 parliamentary election but failed to get elected. He was an executive member of the Colombo District Development Council from 1981 to 1988. He contested the 1988 provincial council election and was elected to the Western Provincial Council. He was appointed Minister of Health and Economic Infrastructure.

Sellasamy was one of the CWC/UNP alliance's candidates in Colombo District at the 1989 parliamentary election. He was elected and entered Parliament. He was appointed Minister of State for Transport on 18 February 1989. He became Minister of State for Industries on 30 March 1990.

Sellasamy was removed as general-secretary of the CWC in 1994 and subsequently formed the Ceylon National Workers' Congress (CNWC). A long legal battle ensued between Sellasamy and CWC leader Savumiamoorthy Thondaman which prevented the CWC from using its "Cockerel" symbol to contest elections. Following the death of Thondaman in 1999 Sellasamy tried unsuccessfully to gain the leadership of the CWC from Thondaman's grandson Arumugam Thondaman.

Sellasamy was appointed as one of the CNWC/DWC/UCPF/UNP alliance's National List MP's in the Sri Lankan Parliament following the 2000 parliamentary election.

Sellasamy rejoined the CWC in October 2001 as its deputy president. He contested the 2001 parliamentary election as one of the United National Front's (UNF) candidates in Colombo District but failed to get elected. He was appointed as one of the UNF's National List MP's in the Sri Lankan Parliament following the 2004 parliamentary election. He was appointed Deputy Minister of Posts in January 2007.

Sellasamy was a member of the University of Colombo's senate and the National Agricultural Diversification and Settlement Authority (NADSA).

Electoral history

References

1926 births
2020 deaths

Ceylon Workers' Congress politicians
Health ministers of Sri Lankan provinces
Indian Tamil politicians of Sri Lanka
Indian Tamil trade unionists of Sri Lanka
Members of the 9th Parliament of Sri Lanka
Members of the 11th Parliament of Sri Lanka
Members of the 13th Parliament of Sri Lanka
Members of the Western Provincial Council
Ministers of state of Sri Lanka
Sri Lankan Hindus
State ministers of Sri Lanka
United People's Freedom Alliance politicians